The 2021–22 Boston University Terriers men's basketball team represented Boston University in the 2021–22 NCAA Division I men's basketball season. The Terriers, led by 11th-year head coach Joe Jones, played their home games at Case Gym in Boston, Massachusetts as members of the Patriot League.

Previous season
In a season limited due to the ongoing COVID-19 pandemic, the Terriers finished the 2020–21 season 7–11, 6–10 in Patriot League play to finish in third place in the North Division. In the Patriot League tournament, they defeated Lehigh in the first round before falling to eventual tournament champions Colgate in the quarterfinals.

Roster

Schedule and results

|-
!colspan=12 style=| Non-conference regular season

|-
!colspan=12 style=| Patriot League regular season

|-
!colspan=9 style=| Patriot League tournament

|-
!colspan=9 style=| CBI

Source

References

Boston University Terriers men's basketball seasons
Boston University Terriers
Boston University
Boston University Terriers men's basketball
Boston University Terriers men's basketball
Boston University Terriers men's basketball
Boston University Terriers men's basketball